Coddingville is an unincorporated community in Medina County, in the U.S. state of Ohio.

History
The first settlement at Coddingville was made in 1817. The community was named for Burt Codding, one of the pioneer settlers. A post office called Coddingville was established in 1850, and remained in operation until 1865.

References

Unincorporated communities in Medina County, Ohio
Unincorporated communities in Ohio